The Republic of the Congo competed at the 2004 Summer Olympics in Athens, Greece, from 13 to 29 August 2004.

Athletics 

Congolese athletes have so far achieved qualifying standards in the following athletics events (up to a maximum of 3 athletes in each event at the 'A' Standard, and 1 at the 'B' Standard).

Men

Women

Key
Note–Ranks given for track events are within the athlete's heat only
Q = Qualified for the next round
q = Qualified for the next round as a fastest loser or, in field events, by position without achieving the qualifying target
NR = National record
N/A = Round not applicable for the event
Bye = Athlete not required to compete in round

Fencing

Congo has qualified a single fencer.

Men

Judo

Congo has qualified a single judoka.

Swimming 

Men

Women

References

External links
 Official Report of the XXVIII Olympiad
 

Nations at the 2004 Summer Olympics
2004
2004 in the Republic of the Congo sport